The 2015 Eurocup Formula Renault 2.0 season was a multi-event motor racing championship for open wheel, formula racing cars held across Europe. The championship featured drivers competing in 2 litre Formula Renault single seat race cars that conform to the technical regulations for the championship. The 2015 season was the 25th Eurocup Formula Renault 2.0 season organized by Renault Sport. The season began at Ciudad del Motor de Aragón on 25 April and finished on 18 October at Circuito de Jerez. The series formed part of the World Series by Renault meetings, with seventeen races at seven race meetings. The championship was won by British driver Jack Aitken.

Teams and drivers

Race calendar and results
The calendar for the 2015 season was announced on 20 October 2014, on the final day of the 2014 season. The championship returned to Silverstone and Le Mans, replacing rounds at Moscow Raceway and Paul Ricard. Three of the season's seven meetings were held as a triple-header format, amassing to a total of seventeen races. On 11 February 2015, it was announced that the Silverstone round would be moved back a week due to the circuit reacquiring the rights to host the British round of the 2015 MotoGP season.

Championship standings
Points system
Points were awarded to the top 10 classified finishers.

Drivers' Championship

Teams' Championship

Season summary
The start of the season saw Swiss driver Louis Delétraz taking the championship leadership after two victories at the season opener in Aragon and one in the Hungaroring. He arrived to the season finale still ahead on points, with other seven drivers also able to become champion: Swiss Kevin Jörg, British Jack Aitken, French Anthoine Hubert, British Jake Hughes, Japanese Ukyo Sasahara, Norwegian Dennis Olsen, and British Ben Barnicoat. Aitken (previously winner in the Hungaroring, Silverstone and the Nürburgring) won the two first races at the final race meeting in Jerez, securing the championship, while Delétraz ended as championship runner-up. German team Josef Kaufmann Racing was the teams' champion.

References

External links
 Renault-Sport official website

Eurocup Formula Renault 2.0
Eurocup
Renault Eurocup